Eichstätt is a Landkreis (district) in Bavaria, Germany. It is bounded by (from the south and clockwise) the districts of Neuburg-Schrobenhausen, Donau-Ries, Weißenburg-Gunzenhausen, Roth, Neumarkt, Kelheim and Pfaffenhofen, and by the city of Ingolstadt.

History

The district of Eichstätt in its present form was established in 1972 by merging the former district of Eichstätt with parts of the dissolved districts of Ingolstadt, Beilngries, Riedenburg and Hilpoltstein. The city of Eichstätt lost its status as a district-free city and became the capital of the new district.
Today the Eichstätt district has powerful economic structures. The rate of jobless people is only 1.2% (June 2011).

Geography

The district is located in the southern part of the Frankish Alb. 80% of the district are situated in the Altmühltal Nature Park. In the southeast the Danube forms a short part of the border.

Coat of arms
The coat of arms displays:
 a torch, symbolising the industrial area within the metropolitan area of Ingolstadt
 a crosier, symbolising the bishopric of Eichstätt
 an antler, symbolising the medieval county of Hirschberg (German Hirsch = "deer")
 the blue and white checkered pattern of Bavaria

Towns and municipalities

References

External links

Official website (German)
Altmühltal Nature Park (German, English)

 
Districts of Bavaria